Robert Rabinowitz (b. Brooklyn, New York) is an American illustrator and graphic designer.

Career
Rabinowitz was a long-time partner of Bob Gill, who he had first met in the US Army in the 1950s. In 1975 Gill and Rabinowitz created Beatlemania, a multimedia history of the 1960s set to music by The Beatles. The show was the largest multimedia musical on Broadway up until that time.

The pair's next project was a celebration of the Lincoln Center's 20th anniversary, involving five giant movie screens mounted on the facade of the Metropolitan Opera House, playing a history of the center. After this they were invited to create a retrospective play of the history of rock'n'roll music. Entitled Rock 'N Roll! The First 5,000 Years, it previewed at the St. James Theatre on October 5, 1982, officially opening on October 24, before closing on October 31 after just nine shows, to terrible reviews.

Family
With his family, Rabinowitz owns Villa Rosa Bonheur in the Spuyten Duyvil section of Riverdale, New York. He is the brother of the former Chief Justice of the Supreme Court of Alaska,  Jay Rabinowitz, cousin of integrative medicine media personality, Barrie Cassileth, and uncle to Olympic Cross Country Skier, Judy Rabinowitz.

References

American illustrators
American people of Latvian-Jewish descent
American graphic designers
Jewish American artists
People from Brooklyn
Living people
Logo designers
Year of birth missing (living people)
21st-century American Jews